Minuscule 662 (in the Gregory-Aland numbering), ε 298 (von Soden), is a Greek minuscule manuscript of the New Testament, on parchment. Palaeographically it has been assigned to the 12th century. The manuscript is lacunose. Scrivener labelled it by 632e.

Description 

The codex contains the text of the four Gospels, on 254 parchment leaves (size ), with only one lacuna (Luke 24:48-52). The text is written in one column per page, 22 lines per page, in very small letters.

It is superbly illuminated.

Text 

The Greek text of the codex is a representative of the Byzantine text-type. Kurt Aland placed it in Category V.

According to the Claremont Profile Method it belongs to the textual cluster Cl 121.

The Lection of Saint Pelagia (John 8:3-11) is obelized.

History 

F. H. A. Scrivener and C. R. Gregory dated the manuscript to the 12th century. Currently the manuscript is dated by the INTF to the 12th century.

The manuscript once belonged to Hamilton. It was bought by Butler in 1889.

The manuscript was added to the list of New Testament manuscripts by Scrivener. Gregory saw it in 1887.

Currently the manuscript is housed at the Gallery of Victoria (Ms. 710/5), in Melbourne.

See also 

 List of New Testament minuscules
 Biblical manuscript
 Textual criticism

References

Further reading 

 

Greek New Testament minuscules
11th-century biblical manuscripts